Charles Étienne Louis Ganderax (25 February 1855 – January 1940) was a French journalist and drama critic. He was literary editor of the Revue de Paris with Henri Meilhac, a member of the Académie française.

A student at the École Normale Supérieure (1873), agrégé de lettres (1876), he collaborated with Le Parlement, Le Figaro, the Revue bleue, L’Univers illustré, La Vie parisienne, Le Gaulois, Revue illustrée, Revue des deux mondes etc.

 Works 
 Miss Fanfare Pepa, comedy in 3 acts (with Henri Meilhac), created at the Comédie-Française, 31 October 1888

Prefaces
 Georges Bizet, Lettres... Impressions de Rome, 1857-1860. La Commune, 1871.1904: Contes parisiens du second Empire'' (1866)...

External links 
 Louis Ganderax on data.bnf.fr
 Louis Ganderax (1855-1940) : une plume au vitriol on Archives de Croissy
 Louis Ganderax on Medias 19
 Notice on Louis Ganderax by Georges Renard on Paris-sorbonne

19th-century French journalists
French male journalists
19th-century French dramatists and playwrights
20th-century French journalists
French theatre critics
École Normale Supérieure alumni
Writers from Paris
1855 births
1940 deaths
19th-century French male writers